The 6th Cavalry Division was a cavalry division of the Red Army from the Russian Civil War to the beginning of World War II.

Formed in March 1919, the division became part of the famed 1st Cavalry Army in the fall of that year, and fought in the Red Army's successful counteroffensive against the Armed Forces of South Russia. After Denikin's defeat in the spring of 1920, the division and the 1st Cavalry Army were transferred northwestwards to fight in the Polish–Soviet War, where they recaptured Kiev. During the summer of 1920 the division and the army became bogged down in the Battle of Lwów, which resulted in Soviet defeat to the north in the Battle of Warsaw, and the reinforcing 1st Cavalry Army was defeated when it attempted to intervene in the latter. This began a disorganized Soviet retreat, which the army participated in. The division and its army were transferred to Crimea, where Pyotr Nikolayevich Wrangel led the remnants of the White Army. After the evacuation of remaining White forces from Crimea, the division was moved to Belarus, where it remained for the interwar period. In 1939 and 1940, the 6th Division participated in the Soviet invasion of Poland and the Soviet occupation of Lithuania. After returning to Belarus at the conclusion of the Lithuanian occupation, the division was destroyed in the June 1941 German invasion of the Soviet Union and officially disbanded in September.

History 
The division traced its lineage back to the 1st Stavropol Cavalry Division, formed in October 1918 from the Stavropol Cavalry Brigade, composed of Stavropol partisan cavalry. On 20 January 1919, the division was renamed the 1st Soviet Cavalry Division. After the disbandment of the Caspian-Caucasian Front, all of its cavalry units, including the division, were consolidated into a single cavalry division by an order dated 18 March 1919. On 26 March, the division was redesignated the 6th Cavalry Division. The division became part of the 10th Army and was commanded by Iosif Apanasenko. In June it became part of Semyon Budyonny's Cavalry Corps of the 10th Army.

Commanders 
The following officers commanded the division.
 Savely Negovora (9 January26 March 1919)
 Iosif Apanasenko (26 March24 June 1919)
 Semyonov (24 June14 July 1919)
 Boris Solovyov (acting; 1415 July 1919)
 Iosif Apanasenko (1517 July 1919)
 Alexey Polyakov (acting; 17 July24 August 1919)
 Grigory Baturin (24 August3 October 1919)
 Iosif Apanasenko (3 October3 November 1919)
 Semyon Timoshenko (3 November 1919  5 August 1920)
 Iosif Apanasenko (5 August12 October 1920)
 Yakov Sheko (acting; 1227 October 1920)
 Oka Gorodovikov (27 October 1920  May 1924)
 Alexander Tarnovsky-Terletsky (1926)
 Leonid Veyner (October 1929  17 August 1933)
 Ivan Selivanov (1933)
 Kombrig Dmitry Veynerkh (22 January or 22 April 1934  Unknown)
 Colonel (promoted to Kombrig 17 February 1938) Anton Lopatin (July 1937  September 1938)
 Kombrig (converted to Major general 4 June 1940) Pyotr Makarov (14 August 1939  March 1941)
 Major General Mikhail Konstantinov (14 March  19 September 1941)

References

Citations

Bibliography 
 

Cavalry divisions of the Soviet Union
Military units and formations of the Soviet invasion of Poland